Vodoča is a village in Strumica Municipality, North Macedonia.

Demographics
According to the 2002 census, the village had a total of 318 inhabitants. Ethnic groups in the village include:

Macedonians 316
Serbs 2

References

Villages in Strumica Municipality